Agia Marina is an underground metro station in Athens, Greece. The station has park and ride facilities. A part of the  extension, construction works on the station began in 2007, before the rest of the extension. It was expected to be open by 2010 but was delayed several times due to the Siemens Greek bribery scandal. The station opened to the public on 14 December 2013 and served as the line's eastern terminus until 2020.

Location
The station is located underneath Iera Odos, outside the Egaleo town hall. It is located on the border of Egaleo and Agia Varvara municipalities and also close to the Haidari municipality.

Station description
The station can be accessed by two ground-level entrances, both of which have granite-covered walls and a glass ceiling and lead to the concourse level. The south entrance also bears a blue glass-covered pergola in front of it. The concourse level is rectangular, with granite-covered walls and blue cylindrical columns. One of the walls is covered with rectangular tiles coloured red, yellow and orange. The concourse level's ceiling is grey with two parallel blue stripes above the blue columns. The platforms are on a east-west axis and each platform's decoration is divided in two sections. The east sides' walls are covered with polished granite blocks. In the west sides the platforms are slightly wider, the ceiling is supported by cylindrical blue pillars and the walls are also covered with polished granite tiles. The ceiling is white with two blue stripes above each platform's edge and the part above the tracks is covered with curved white metal panels.

Exits

Antiquities
Parts of an ancient pipeline were discovered during the station's construction. The pipeline is exhibited on the concourse level.

Station layout

References

Athens Metro stations
Railway stations opened in 2013
2013 establishments in Greece